Thomas Lacy may refer to:

 Thomas Edgar Lacy (1804–1880), British Army officer
 Thomas Hailes Lacy (1809–1873), British actor, playwright and theatrical manager

See also
 Thomas de Lacy (1773–1844), Anglican priest in Ireland